Albert Walter Libke (September 12, 1918 – March 7, 2003) was an outfielder in Major League Baseball. He played for the Cincinnati Reds.

References

External links

1918 births
2003 deaths
Major League Baseball outfielders
Cincinnati Reds players
Baseball players from Tacoma, Washington